Johnnie Cole is a former American football player and coach. He served as the head football coach at Lane College in Jackson, Tennessee from 2005 to 2007 and at Texas Southern University from 2008 to 2010, compiling a career college football coaching record of 34–32.

Head coaching record

References

Year of birth missing (living people)
Living people
American football quarterbacks
Kansas State Wildcats football coaches
Lane Dragons football coaches
Tennessee State Tigers football coaches
Texas Southern Tigers football coaches
Texas Southern Tigers football players
High school football coaches in Texas